KELO-FM (101.9 FM) is a radio station in Sioux Falls, South Dakota, airing an adult contemporary music format.  At 92.5 FM, KELO-FM was one of the first FM radio stations in South Dakota. It broadcasts from KELO-TV's 2000 foot tower.  The station is owned by Duey E. Wright, through licensee Midwest Communications, Inc.

Its studios are located on South Phillips Avenue in Sioux Falls, while its transmitter is located near Colton.

On October 28, 2013, KELO-FM and its adult contemporary format moved to 101.9 FM, swapping frequencies with country-formatted KTWB.

History

Backyard Broadcasting 
After a 52-year history in Sioux Falls radio, Midcontinent sold all of its stations, including KRRO, to Backyard Broadcasting of Baltimore in 2004. It marked the company's exit from broadcasting, after selling KELO-TV in 1996.

Midwest Communications 
Backyard sold its seven Sioux Falls stations in 2012 to their present owner, Midwest Communications, in a $13.35 million transaction.

Previous logo
 (KELO-FM's logo under previous 92.5 frequency)

References

External links

ELO-FM
Mainstream adult contemporary radio stations in the United States
Radio stations established in 1992
Midwest Communications radio stations